Real estate in Pakistan is a growing sector of the economy of Pakistan.

Real Estate Demand 
Demand for residential properties in Pakistan grew in 2010, leading to increased interest among real estate developers and investors. Since prices have exceeded 10 million PKR, new housing developments are often aimed at the upper middle class. To assist the real-estate sector, the Government of Pakistan announced a reduction in interest rates on mortgage loans in 2012.

In 2017, the housing gap in Punjab, one of the largest provinces of Pakistan, was around 2.3 million units, this figure is expected to reach the figure of 11.3 million units by the end of 2047.

The prominent factors causing the shortages includes rural-to-urban migration, population growth, lower interest rates, and tax incentives, the poor quality of available properties, and the subsidy schemes, like Roshan Apna Ghar, Mera Ghar Mera Pakistan, etc., in urban areas of the country.

According to a report, the population in Pakistan has grown by a CAGR of 2.1% between FY16 to FY21. With the given trend, the figure would reach 231.58 million in FY23. 

The overall real estate industry contributed significantly to Pakistan's GDP during the stated period with a growth rate of between 5.4 % to 5.9%.

Real estate sector worth 
Moreover, many more billions are spent on buying residential and commercial plots. Pakistan's real estate sector is worth anywhere between $300 to $400 billion. According to the Pakistan Bureau of Statistics, construction output accounts for 2% of GDP, with housing representing less than half that total. With the rate of urbanization that Pakistan has been experiencing, there is a growing need for urban planning.

Real estate regulatory authority 
Prime Minister Imran Khan has recommended the formation of the Real Estate Regulatory Authority, while the Association of Builders and Developers is against its formation.

Real estate education 
NED University of Engineering & Technology offers Master of Science in Real Estate Management.

Panjwani Institute of Business Studies & Technology offers Professional Diploma in Real Estate Management

The real estate industry is one of the fastest growing industries in Pakistan

NIREM (National Institute of Real Estate Management) offers Real Estate Professionals Development Program.

Real estate agents 
According to FPCCI (The Federation of Pakistan Chambers of Commerce and Industry), real estate agents are playing an important role in the economic development of the country. "Construction sector has grown by 9% which indicates its strength but this robust sector needs help of the real-estate sector," it said in a 2017 statement.

References

 
 
 
Housing in Pakistan
Construction and civil engineering companies of Pakistan